José Estudillo may refer to:

José María Estudillo (died 1830), early Spanish settler of California, or to one of his sons:
José Joaquín Estudillo (1800–1852), Californian settler
José Antonio Estudillo (1805–1852), Californian settler
José Guadalupe Estudillo, son of José Antonio, California State Treasurer

See also
Estudillo family of California